First-seeded Guillermo Vilas was the defending champion of the singles event at the ABN World Tennis Tournament, but lost in the final against second-seeded Gene Mayer 6–1, 7–6(11–9).

Seeds

Draw

Finals

Upper half

Lower half

References

External links
 ITF tournament edition details

1983 ABN World Tennis Tournament
ABN